Vori may refer to:

Vóri, a village in southern Crete
Igor Vori (born 1980), Croatian handball player
, a Panamanian and Greek cargo ship in service 1952–67